Peggy Cyphers (born 1954) is an American painter, printmaker, professor and art writer, who has shown her work in the U.S. and internationally since 1984. Since Cyphers’ move to New York City over 30 years ago, her inventive and combinatory approaches to the materials of paint, silkscreen and sand have developed into canvases that explore the “Politics of Progress” as it impacts culture and the natural world.

Early life and education 
Cyphers grew up in Baltimore and Chesapeake Beach, Maryland and has been inspired by the Miocene fossil deposits, Calvert Cliffs and aquatic life of the Bay since childhood.  She received her BFA from Towson University and also attended the Maryland Institute College of Art. Upon her move to New York she studied at the Pratt Institute and received an MFA with a Ford Foundation Award.  After graduating with her MFA she started working at the John Weber Gallery and Sonnabend Gallery in New York City. She then became a part of the East Village art scene and began showing her first major work “Modern Fossils.” She became acquainted with the collectors Herbert and Dorothy Vogel and is a part of their noted collection.

Work 
Cyphers’ most recent New York exhibition at The Proposition Gallery received reviews in Art in America, The Brooklyn Rail and ArteryNYC. Recent one-person exhibitions of Cyphers’ work include; Cross Contemporary Art, Noma Gallery, New York Academy of Sciences (NY), Rhode Island College, William Patterson College (NJ), Galerie Asbeck (Copenhagen), Haines Gallery (SF), Betsy Rosenfield (CH), M13, Limbo Gallery, Ground Zero Gallery, Kleinert James Art Center Woodstock, NY, Creon Gallery and Mincher Wilcox (SF).

Cyphers is a tenured adjunct professor of painting at the Pratt Institute. She has also taught at New York University; Parsons; University of North Carolina, Greensboro; Royal Academy of Art Helsinki; Lahti Polytechnic Institute, Lahti, Finland; School of Visual Arts; and New York School of Interior Design.  She has  taught in the Pratt in Venice and Tuscany Programs. Since 1988 Peggy Cyphers’ critical writings have appeared in such publications as Painters on Paintings, Art Journal, Arts Magazine, Tema Celeste, A Gathering of the Tribes, New Observations, Cover, The Thing.net, and Resolve40 as well as catalog essays for museums and galleries. Her curatorial projects have taken place at Exit Art, Solo Impressions and Creon, among other venues.

Cyphers finds her primary inspiration in the natural world and Charles Darwin’s theory of the interconnectedness of all beings. She is interested in techniques found in Chinese landscape painting, Indian sand painting and Surrealism to create her highly original hybrids which critique dominant culture’s over-consumption of the environment. The recent paintings entitled “Animal Spirits” employ pattern and translucency to develop spatial compositions that defy gravity and orientation. They challenge perceptual orientations to envision spaces of expansive consciousness, while relying on direct encounters with water, birds and other animals for visual cues.

Recognition 
Roberta Smith writing in The New York Times said that Cyphers paints "in an effortless style that corrupts and complicates the staining technique originated by Color Field painters like Helen Frankenthaler with various ideas in the air: notational, pattern-prone motifs, landscape references and allusions to textiles and fabric. The plants are still here, but now they are usually soft blooms and plumes of color that also suggest, with a little help from the titles, wet pavement, blurry stop lights or even the Brooklyn Bridge."

Jonathan Goodman wrote in The Brooklyn Rail, "Peggy Cyphers has put on a show of startling originality at the Proposition, located nearby the New Museum on the Lower East Side. The artist, who has more than three decades of experience living and working in New York, calls the exhibition Animal Spirits, in reference to the creatures symbolized by feathers or fur or claws in her compositions."

Art writer Demetria Daniels said to Artnet editor Walter Robinson about the works in Cypher's 2003 solo exhibition at the Proposition that "they're warm and loving".

Her exhibitions have also been reviewed in Artforum, New Criterion, Vogue, the San Francisco Chronicle and the Chicago Tribune, among many other publications.

Grants and honors for her painting include the Peter S. Reed Foundation Grant (2011), Pratt Institute Faculty Fund Award (2011,2001), Elizabeth Foundation for the Arts (1997), National Studio Award, PS.1 Clocktower (1991), National Endowment for the Arts Award in Painting (1989) and the Igor Foundation Award (1987). Cyphers has been a resident artist at Tong Xian Art Residency, Beijing,  Santa Fe Art Institute, International Studio Program NYC, ArtOmi, Yaddo and Triangle Artists Workshop.

References 

1954 births
Living people
20th-century American painters
21st-century American painters
Pratt Institute alumni
Pratt Institute faculty
American women painters
20th-century American women artists
21st-century American women artists
American women academics